Veromies (meaning "taxman") is a city district in Vantaa, Finland. It is located in southeastern Vantaa, in the Aviapolis major region. It is situated south of Helsinki Airport and west of the Tuusulanväylä highway. To the south, Veromies borders the Pakkala district, separated by the Ring III beltway. It also borders the Viinikkala district to the west.

The population of Veromies is 528 (1.1.2014), putting it among the lesser populated districts in Vantaa.

The Veromies district includes small-scale industry, office buildings, and three hotels. The western side of the road Lentoasemantie has recently been named Virkamies, meaning "public official".

References

Districts of Vantaa